A Heavy Mental Christmas is a CD released by heavy metal band Helix in 2008.  It is Helix' 11th full-length studio album and 20th album released overall.  It is a Christmas album featuring both standards and original music.  It was released in Walmart stores in Canada in October 2008 through Universal Music and GBS Records.

Track listing 
 "Rudolph the Red Nosed Reindeer"
 "Rockin' Around the Christmas Tree"
 "Santa Claus Is Back in Town"
 A Wonderful Christmas Time
 "Jingle Bell Rock"
 "Happy Xmas (War Is Over)"
 "Sock It to Me Santa"
 "Jingle Bells"
 "Silent Night"
 "Christmas Time Is Here Again" *

 Original song written by Steve Georgakopoulos, Gord Prior, and Brian Vollmer

Credits
Produced and arranged by Gord Prior
Co-produced by Brian Vollmer, Steve Georgakopoulos and Aaron Murray
Recorded and mixed by Aaron Murray

Recorded and mixed between August 7 and 27, 2008 at The A Room in London, Ontario.
Mastered at Sterling Sound, New York.

Helix members
Brian Vollmer – lead vocals
Rick VanDyk – lead guitar
Jim Lawson – lead guitar
Brent "Ned" Niemi – drums
Paul Fonseca – bass guitar

This was the current Helix lineup listed and pictured on the CD packaging, but not the musicians who were credited with recording the CD.

Musicians
Brian Vollmer – lead vocals
Steve Georgakopoulos – all rhythm guitars, lead guitar
Gord Prior – back up vocals, arrangements, tambourines and jingle bells
Brent "Ned" Neimi – drums and backup vocals
Paul Fonseca – bass and backup vocals
Rick VanDyk – lead guitar and backup vocals
Aaron Murray – keyboards on "Sock It To Me Santa"
Doug Weir – backup vocals

References

Helix (band) albums
2008 Christmas albums
Christmas albums by Canadian artists
Heavy metal Christmas albums